Elmwood is a Federal style house near Shepherdstown, West Virginia. Located on land claimed in 1732 by Edward Lucas II, it was built in 1797 by his son, Edward Lucas III.  During the Civil War the house was used as a field hospital.  It remained in the Lucas family until 1948.

The brick house is two stories over a raised basement, with a center-hall arrangement on both levels. The brick on the side and rear elevations has glazed headers. The house is unusual in the location of a side door in the dining room on the gable end. A portico with a new entry door was added in the nineteenth century.

References

External links

American Civil War sites in West Virginia
Federal architecture in West Virginia
Historic American Buildings Survey in West Virginia
Houses completed in 1797
Houses in Jefferson County, West Virginia
Houses on the National Register of Historic Places in West Virginia
Jefferson County, West Virginia in the American Civil War
National Register of Historic Places in Jefferson County, West Virginia
Robert Lucas family
Shepherdstown, West Virginia
American Civil War hospitals